The 2009 Grand Valley State Lakers football team was an American football team that represented Grand Valley State University in the Great Lakes Intercollegiate Athletic Conference (GLIAC) during the 2009 NCAA Division II football season. In their sixth season under head coach Chuck Martin, the Lakers compiled a 13–2 record (9–1 against conference opponents), won the GLIAC championship for the fifth consecutive season, and qualified for the NCAA Division II playoff for the ninth straight year. 

In the playoffs, the Lakers received a bye in the first round and won in the second round, quarterfinals, and semifinals before losing to Northwest Missouri State in the national championship game.

Statistical leaders included James Berezik with 1,280 rushing yards, Brad Iciek with 3,194 passing yards, Blake Somlen with 917 receiving yards, and Justin Trimble with 107 points scored (18 field goals and 53 points after touchdown).

The team played its home games at Lubbers Stadium in Allendale Charter Township, Michigan.

Schedule

References

Grand Valley State
Great Lakes Intercollegiate Athletic Conference football champion seasons
Grand Valley State Lakers football seasons
Grand Valley State Lakers football